The Murrí Fault is an oblique thrust fault in the department of Antioquia in northwestern Colombia.

Etymology 
The fault is named after the Murrí River in Antioquia.

Description 
Located in the western limb of the Western Ranges of the Colombian Andes. The fault puts Cretaceous mafic igneous rocks to the east in contact with Tertiary marine sedimentary rocks to the west. The fault cuts mud flows dated at about 10,000 to 15,000 years. It causes strong lineaments and offsets terraces and alluvial deposits.

The fault forms the course of the Penderisco River and cuts perpendicular to the Ocaidó Valley. Some authors consider the fault the southern part of the Murrí-Mutatá Fault.

See also 

 List of earthquakes in Colombia
 Murindó Fault
 Romeral Fault System

References

Bibliography

Maps

Further reading 
 

Seismic faults of Colombia
Thrust faults
Strike-slip faults
Inactive faults
Faults